Khalaf Aly oghlu Khalafov is an Azerbaijani diplomat who is serving as Deputy Minister of Foreign Affairs of the Republic of Azerbaijan, Special representative of the President of the Republic of Azerbaijan for border and Caspian Sea issues.

Life 
Khalaf Khalafov was born on September 21, 1959, Armenia SSR. He studied International law at Taras Shevchenko National University of Kyiv in 1977–1982. He continued his education at the Diplomatic Academy of the Ministry of Foreign Affairs of the USSR in 1990–1991. He is married and has two children. He speaks German and Russian.

Career 
Khalafov worked in the Ministry of Internal Affairs of Azerbaijani SSR as an Inspector, Head of Division in 1983–1990. He started his diplomatic career in the Ministry of Foreign Affairs of Azerbaijan in 1991. He served there as Second secretary of the Consular Department in 1991–1992, Head of the Treaty and Legal Department in 1992–1997, and Deputy Minister of Foreign Affairs of Azerbaijan in the period of 1997–2018. In 2018-2019 he served as the Chief of Office of the Cabinet of Ministers of the Republic of Azerbaijan. On May 3, 2019, Khalaf Khalafov was appointed the Special Representative of the President of Azerbaijan for border and the Caspian Sea issues. Since May 2019, he is the Deputy Minister of Foreign Affairs of Azerbaijan.

Awards 

  – Ambassador Extraordinary and Plenipotentiary of Azerbaijan (2002);
  – Honored Lawyer of the Republic of Azerbaijan (2009);
  – Officer's Cross of the Order of Merit (2009).
  – State Counselor's degree of the first degree (2018);
  – Order "For Service to the Fatherland" of the second degree (2019);
 –  Badge "For contribution to international cooperation" of MFA of RF (2019)

References

External links 
Official website of the MFA of Azerbaijan

Armenian Azerbaijanis
Living people
Azerbaijani diplomats
1959 births
Taras Shevchenko National University of Kyiv alumni